SR 177 may refer to:

Saunders-Roe SR.177, a rocket-powered jet fighter-interceptor
State Road 177 or State Route 177